Sobatu (also Romanized as S̄obātū; also known as Şoḩbatū) is a village in Sahrarud Rural District, in the Central District of Fasa County, Fars Province, Iran. At the 2006 census, its population was 64, in 12 families.

References 

Populated places in Fasa County